Smokin' Blues is a live album by blues guitarist John Mayall. This collection of songs come from a set of shows John Mayall completed in Frankfurt, Germany and has been released through Secret Records. Tracks 1-4 were recorded on 2 May 1972 and tracks 5-12 were recorded on 17 May 1973. The main difference between these two gigs is the tenor saxophone player, Clifford Solomon in 1972 and Red Holloway in 1973.

Track listing

"Band Introduction (Narrative)"
"Got You on My Mind"
"No Smoking"
"No Holds Barred"
"Band Intro (Narrative)"
"Feels Good in Frankfurt"
"Next Time Around"
"Freddie's Request (Narrative)"
"Sad to Be Alone"
"Red Presents Blue Mitchell (Narrative)"
"Filthy McNasty"
"Make My Bed Tonight"

Personnel

John Mayall ; guitar, vocals, harmonica, piano
Freddy Robinson ; electric guitar
Victor Gaskin ; bass 
Keef Hartley ; drums
 Blue Mitchell ; trumpet, flügelhorn
Cliff Solomon ; alto saxophone (tracks 1–4)
Red Holloway ; tenor saxophone (tracks 5–12)

2012 live albums
John Mayall albums